is a Japanese girl group formed by Dear Stage in 2019. They debuted with the single, "Melancholic Circus", on December 25, 2019.

History
On July 31, 2019, Meme Tokyo was introduced as Dempagumi.inc's junior group. On October 5, 2019, Soli went on hiatus to focus on her education and Dempagumi.inc's Rin Kaname joined the group as a support member under the name Pero. The group released their debut single, "Melancholic Circus", on December 25.

On March 18, 2020, their second single, "Retro Future", was released. On June 2, Soli resumed activities and Pero's support period ended. On July 29, the goup released their third single, "Moratorium Aquarium". On December 14, Asuka withdrew from the group.

On January 29, 2021, new member Sae, joined the group. On February 16, Rito became a concurrent member of Dempagumi.inc. On April 5, Koromo went on hiatus due to health problems. The group released their fourth single, "Antisuggest", on April 21. On June 12, Koromo graduated from the group. On July 16, new members, Mistsuki and Nene joined the group. They released their fifth single, "The Struggle is Real", as their major label debut through Toy's Factory on August 25, 2021.

On April 13, 2022, the group's sixth single, Animore, was released.

On February 8, 2023, Meme Tokyo's debut album, Meme Tokyo., was released. Their first EP, Memetic Infection, will be released on June 7.

Members

Current
Mew (former member of the second generation of Bis)
Rito (concurrent member of Dempagumi.inc)
Soli (former member of Rare Stage)
Sae (former member of Miss Me)
Mitsuki
Nene

Former
Pero (support member)
Asuka
Koromo

Timeline

Discography

Studio albums

Extended plays

Singles

As lead artist

References

Japanese girl groups
Japanese idol groups
Japanese pop music groups
Musical groups from Tokyo
Musical groups established in 2019
2019 establishments in Japan